Physopyga is a genus of flies in the family Dolichopodidae found in Papua New Guinea. It contains a single species, Physopyga miranda.

References

Rhaphiinae
Dolichopodidae genera
Monotypic Diptera genera
Diptera of Australasia
Insects of Papua New Guinea